Basil Edmund "Baz" O'Meara (June 5, 1892 – October 25, 1971), was a Canadian sports journalist. A columnist for the Montreal Star, he won the Elmer Ferguson Memorial Award in 1984 and is a member of the media section of the Hockey Hall of Fame. In 1979, O'Meara was inducted into the Canadian Football Hall of Fame. O'Meara was the sports editor of the Ottawa Journal during the 1920s, and mentored his successor Bill Westwick. He joined the Star in 1929 and retired at the age of 76 around 1968. Although controversy exists over this claim, he was widely credited with nicknaming Maurice Richard "Rocket". He began his career at the Ottawa Free Press in 1910. He died of a massive stroke in 1971.

References

1892 births
1971 deaths
Canadian sports journalists
Canadian Football Hall of Fame inductees
Elmer Ferguson Award winners